The Silver Bells Public School is an English medium educational school located in, Nahan, India. The school caters for students from Class 1 to Class 8, Pre-Nursery and Nursery classes for children starting from age 31/2 years.
The school was established in 1980s by its founder Smt. Santosh Chauhan. The School offers a range of extra-curricular activities like chess, dramatics, football and music.

References

Schools in Sirmaur district
Educational institutions established in 1988
1988 establishments in Himachal Pradesh